"Bombers" is a song written by English singer-songwriter David Bowie. It was recorded in July 1971 and intended for the album Hunky Dory, but was replaced at the last minute by the cover "Fill Your Heart".

It was released as a promo single by RCA in the US in November 1971, backed by a remix of "Eight Line Poem" that can only be found on this single (both tracks were also issued on an extremely limited edition promotional LP by RCA/Gem). A bootleg version backing "London Bye Ta-Ta" was also released in the early 1970s.  The track was eventually given wide release as a bonus track on the Rykodisc reissue of Hunky Dory in 1990.

The song was officially released for the second time in 2017 on a newly mixed re-issue of the promotional RCA/Gem LP (commonly entitled "Bowpromo") as an exclusive release for Record Store Day.

Track listing
 "Bombers" (Bowie)
 "Eight Line Poem" (Bowie)

Production credits
 Producer:
 Ken Scott
 Musicians:
 David Bowie: vocals, guitar
 Mick Ronson: guitar
 Trevor Bolder: bass
 Mick Woodmansey: drums
 Rick Wakeman: piano

Live versions
Bowie played "Bombers" on the BBC show In Concert: John Peel on 3 June 1971. This was broadcast on 20 June 1971 and released in 2000 on the album Bowie at the Beeb.
Bowie played the song during his set at the Glastonbury Festival, Worthy Farm, Pilton, UK, in the early hours of 20 June 1971.

Notes

David Bowie songs
1971 songs
Songs written by David Bowie